Hristo (also spelled Khristo) is a Bulgarian masculine given name, ultimately derived from "Christ". Notable people with the name include:

 Hristo Arangelov (born 1978), Bulgarian footballer
 Hristo Batandzhiev (died 1913), Bulgarian revolutionary
 Hristo Bonev (born 1947), Bulgarian footballer
 Hristo Botev (1848–1876), Bulgarian poet and national revolutionary
 Hristo Borisov Hall, arena in Varna, Bulgaria
 Hristo Botev Stadium (disambiguation), several stadiums
 Hristo Chernopeev (1868–1915), Bulgarian revolutionary and member of the revolutionary movement in Macedonia
 Hristo Donchev (born 1928), Bulgarian cross country skier
 Khristo Furnigov (born 1966), retired boxer from Bulgaria
 Hristo Georgiev (canoeist), Bulgarian sprint canoeist
 Hristo Georgiev (patron) (1824–1872), Bulgarian entrepreneur and philanthropist
 Hristo Gospodinov (born 1979), Bulgarian football midfielder
Hadzhi Hristo (1821–1829), Bulgarian revolutionary (bg)
 Hristo Iliev (volleyball player) (born 1951), Bulgarian volleyball player
 Hristo Koilov (born 1969), Bulgarian footballer
 Hristo Lukov (1887–1943), Bulgarian general who led the Union of Bulgarian National Legions (SBNL)
 Hristo Makedonski (1835–1916), Bulgarian hajduk voivode and revolutionary
 Khristo Markov (born 1965), triple jumper from Bulgaria
 Hristo Markov (footballer) (born 1985), Bulgarian footballer
 Hristo Mladenov (1928–1996), Bulgarian football player and manager
 Hristo Nikolov – Choko (born 1939), Bulgarian football player
 Hristo Prodanov (1943–1984), Bulgarian mountaineer
 Hristo Shopov (born 1964), Bulgarian actor
 Hristo Silyanov (1880–1939), Bulgarian revolutionary, historian and memoirist
 Hristo Smirnenski (1898–1923), Bulgarian poet and prose writer
 Hristo Stambolski (1843–1932), Bulgarian physician, revolutionary, statesman, and figure of the Bulgarian National Revival
 Hristo Stoichkov (born 1966), Bulgarian footballer and football manager
 Hristo Stoyanov (born 1953), Bulgarian volleyball player
 Hristo Tatarchev (1869–1952), Bulgarian revolutionary and leader of the revolutionary movement in Macedonia and Eastern Thrace
 Hristo Tsvetanov (born 1978), Bulgarian male volleyball player
 Hristo Turlakov (born 1979), Bulgarian figure skater
 Hristo Uzunov (1878–1905), Bulgarian revolutionary of the Internal Macedonian Revolutionary Organization
 Hristo Yanev (born 1979), Bulgarian football player
 Hristo Yovov (born 1977), Bulgarian footballer
 Hristo Zahariev, Bulgarian basketball player
 Hristo Zlatinski (born 1985), Bulgarian football player

See also 
 Christo (name)
 Hristov, the derived surname

Bulgarian masculine given names